The Kolb Slingshot is an American tandem two seat, high wing, strut-braced, pusher configuration, conventional landing gear-equipped ultralight aircraft, that was produced in kit form by New Kolb Aircraft of London, Kentucky and intended for amateur construction.

By mid-2014, the company was no longer offering the model for sale and production had ended.

Design and development
The Slingshot was designed as a two-seat ultralight with a small wing and high cruise speed for the installed power, capable of delivering speeds comparable to a general aviation aircraft without the associated cost or complexity. In its home country the aircraft is normally licensed in the Experimental - amateur-built category.

The design features a forward fuselage of welded 4130 steel tubing, mated to an aluminum tailboom. The horizontal stabilizer, tail fin and wings are also constructed of riveted aluminum tubing with all flying surfaces covered in doped aircraft fabric. The wings and horizontal tail are quick-folding for storage and ground transport. The Slingshot can be made ready to fly from trailering in 15 minutes.

The long conventional landing gear consist of sprung tubing for the main gear, with a steerable sprung tailwheel.

The company described the Slingshot's two seat capabilities, "the rear passenger seat is designed for average size people, up to 175 pounds. The seating arrangement has the passenger's legs overlapping the pilot's seat. This allows the fuselage to be shorter and more compact. It also saves a lot of weight.".

Operational history
In reviewing the aircraft Andre Cliche said:

Specifications (Slingshot)

See also

References

External links
Official website archive on Archive.org

Slingshot
1990s United States ultralight aircraft